Aniruddha Bose (born 11 April 1959) is a judge of Supreme Court of India. He is former chief justice of Jharkhand High Court and judge of Calcutta High Court.

Education & career
Bose was educated at the St. Lawrence High School, Kolkata, and was graduated in B. Com from the St. Xavier's College, Kolkata. He then completed the Bachelor of Laws from the Surendranath Law College, Kolkata. 

After the enrollment he started practice on constitutional, civil and intellectual property matters in the Calcutta High Court in 1985. Bose worked in the original side as well as the appellate side of the High Court. He was elevated as permanent judge of the Calcutta High Court in January 2004. His name was recommended for elevation as the Chief Justice of Delhi High Court but returned by the Government of India, with the observation that he does not have the experience to handle the affairs of a prominent High Court like Delhi. The collegium reconsidered the proposal and he was transferred to Jharkhand High Court as chief justice on 4 August 2018. On 24 May 2019 he was elevated as a judge of Supreme Court of India.

References

1959 births
Living people
20th-century Indian judges
20th-century Indian lawyers
21st-century Indian lawyers
21st-century Indian judges
Chief Justices of the Jharkhand High Court
Judges of the Calcutta High Court
Justices of the Supreme Court of India
People from Kolkata
Surendranath Law College alumni
University of Calcutta alumni